The 2021 Americana Music Honors & Awards, 20th ceremony, were held on Wednesday, September 22, 2021, at Ryman Auditorium the in Nashville, Tennessee. The marquee event for the Americana Music Association, artists are awarded for outstanding achievements in the music industry. This was the first ceremony to be held since 2019, following the cancellation of the 2020 awards due to the COVID-19 pandemic. The show was broadcast on Circle in the US for the first time and was also available to watch in its entirety on Facebook, alongside a highlights show that aired on PBS as part of Austin City Limits.

Performers

Winners and nominees 
Winners in Bold.

Honors

Americana Trailblazer Award 

 The Mavericks

Free Speech Award/Inspiration Award 

 Carla Thomas

Lifetime Achievement Award for Performance 

 Keb' Mo'

Lifetime Achievement Award for Producer/Engineer 

 Trina Shoemaker

Legacy of Americana Award 

 Fisk Jubilee Singers

Presenters
Brandi Carlile
Sarah Jarosz
Joe Henry
Ketch Secor
Sheryl Crow
Bruce Robison
Rodney Crowell
Aoife O'Donovan
Keifer Sutherland
Allison Russell
Valerie June
Tony Brown
Shooter Jennings
Yola
Anthony Mason

References 

American music awards
2021 music awards